Integration testing (sometimes called integration and testing, abbreviated I&T) is the phase in software testing in which individual software modules are combined and tested as a group. Integration testing is conducted to evaluate the compliance of a system or component with specified functional requirements. It occurs after unit testing and before system testing. Integration testing takes as its input modules that have been unit tested, groups them in larger aggregates, applies tests defined in an integration test plan to those aggregates, and delivers as its output the integrated system ready for system testing.

Approach 
Some different types of integration testing are big-bang, mixed (sandwich), risky-hardest, top-down, and bottom-up. Other Integration Patterns are: collaboration integration, backbone integration, layer integration, client-server integration, distributed services integration and high-frequency integration.

In big-bang testing, most of the developed modules are coupled together to form a complete software system or major part of the system and then used for integration testing. This method is very effective for saving time in the integration testing process. However, if the test cases and their results are not recorded properly, the entire integration process will be more complicated and may prevent the testing team from achieving the goal of integration testing.

In bottom-up testing, the lowest level components are tested first, and are then used to facilitate the testing of higher level components. The process is repeated until the component at the top of the hierarchy is tested. All the bottom or low-level modules, procedures or functions are integrated and then tested. After the integration testing of lower level integrated modules, the next level of modules will be formed and can be used for integration testing. This approach is helpful only when all or most of the modules of the same development level are ready. This method also helps to determine the levels of software developed and makes it easier to report testing progress in the form of a percentage.

In top-down testing, the top integrated modules are tested first and the branch of the module is tested step by step until the end of the related module.

Sandwich testing combines top-down testing with bottom up testing. One limitation to this sort of testing is that any conditions not stated in specified integration tests, outside of the confirmation of the execution of design items, will generally not be tested.

See also
 Design predicates
 Functional testing
 Continuous integration

References

Software testing
Hardware testing